Ashurabad may refer to:
 Ashurabad, Gilan (عاشوراباد - ‘Āshūrābād)
 Ashurabad, Golestan (اشوراباد - Āshūrābād)
 Ashurabad, Lorestan (اشوراباد - Āshūrābād)